Jougne is a commune in the Doubs department in the Bourgogne-Franche-Comté region in eastern France.

Geography
It lies in the Jura Mountains, which form the border between France and Switzerland. The commune dominates the valley of the Jougnena. From Piquemiette, there are views of the Alps.

History

In the Middle Ages, Jougne was an important toll station on the road to Italy. Of the ancient fortifications, a gate and ramparts, as well as ruins of the fort, remain. The chapel of Saint Maurice dates from the 12th century and has a Carolingian crypt.

Population

Tourism
Jougne is a tourist town noted for winter sports. The ski resort of Piquemiette caters to alpine skiers, but there are also hiking and cross-country ski trails in the forest of la Joux. There is also an animal museum and numerous hotels and restaurants.

Twin towns — sister cities
Jougne is twinned with:

  Buttigliera Alta, Italy

See also
 Communes of the Doubs department

References

External links

 Jougne on the intercommunal Web site of the department 

Communes of Doubs